Benson is an unincorporated community in DeSoto Parish, Louisiana, United States.

Located approximately halfway between Mansfield and Converse on the Kansas City Southern Railroad, it is an historic sawmill town.

Notes

Unincorporated communities in DeSoto Parish, Louisiana
Unincorporated communities in Louisiana